The 1990 Iowa Hawkeyes football team represented the University of Iowa in the 1990 NCAA Division I-A football season. The Hawkeyes played their home games at Kinnick Stadium and were led by legendary coach Hayden Fry.

After starting 7–1 and rising to #6 in the polls, Iowa finished the season with an 8–4 record (6–2 Big Ten), winning a four-way tie for the Big Ten Conference championship by defeating the three other teams atop the conference standings – Michigan, Michigan State, and Illinois – in their respective head-to-head matchups. The Hawkeyes earned their third trip to Pasadena in ten years, but fell behind early in the 1991 Rose Bowl and lost 46–34 to the Washington Huskies. It would be another 25 years before Iowa would make a return trip to the Rose Bowl.

Schedule

Roster

Rankings

Game summaries

Cincinnati

Sources: Box Score and Game Story

Kicking off the start of the 1990 Iowa Hawkeye season, the Hawks welcomed in the Cincinnati Bearcats. The Bearcats finished out the '89 season at 1–9–1 as the Hawks finished out at 5–6. In a game that ended up in a blowout, the Hawks cruised to a 63–10 win. Iowa managed to set records as well as they pummeled the Cincinnati defense. After Cincinnati built a 7–0 lead after an interception and a 1-yard touchdown run from Joe Abrams, the Hawks took command for the afternoon. After a scoreless first quarter, quarterback Matt Rodgers led the Hawks to 28 unanswered points, following two touchdowns from Rodgers, and one each from running backs Nick Bell and Tony Stewart. Cincinnati scored its last points of the game with a late field goal and ended the half with Iowa up 28–10. After halftime, Iowa went on cruise control. Iowa went on to score 21 points in the 3rd and 14 in the 4th to win the contest 63–10. Rodgers ended the game going 15–27 on passes with 191 yards. Hawkeye offense racked up 662 yards with 455 yards rushing. The defense was excellent as well. The Bearcats were allowed only 4 first downs and 69 yards rushing.

Iowa State

Sources: Box Score and Game Story

The Hawkeyes won a high-scoring affair with in-state rival Iowa State, their eighth in a series of fifteen straight wins in the rivalry.

at Miami (FL)

Sources: Box Score and Game Story

After pulling to within 24–21 midway through the third quarter, Iowa fell to the mighty Miami Hurricanes in the Orange Bowl, 48–21. It was Miami's 33rd consecutive home win. Even in showing some competitiveness at the game in Miami, FL, few Hawk fans could have guessed what was going to follow, especially following the 5–6 debacle of the previous season, which represented the first season Iowa had not gone to a bowl since 1980.

at Michigan State

Sources: Box Score and Game Story

In opening Big Ten play, Iowa started what ended up being their third Rose Bowl run in ten seasons.  What set this conference season apart from others was that the Hawkeyes played most of their best football on the road. In weeks 1, 3, and 5, Iowa upset what ended up being the other three teams that tied for the Big 10 championship that season, all at their home venue. First was a wind-blown, defensive struggle at East Lansing, with Iowa holding onto a 12–7 victory.  Hayden Fry admitted after the game that every pass he had Matt Rodgers throw was with the wind, which was blowing at a diagonal across Spartan Stadium.

Wisconsin

Sources: Box Score and Game Story

After falling behind 10–3, the Hawkeyes scored the final 27 points of the game to earn a victory over the Badgers in the first meeting between Hayden Fry and former Iowa assistant Barry Alvarez.

at Michigan

Sources: Box Score and Game Story, Box Score

After a win over (what ended up being cellar-dweller) Wisconsin at home, Iowa traveled to the Big House in Ann Arbor.  The Wolverines were still smarting after a tight, tough loss the previous week against Michigan State and it was Homecoming week.  But Iowa kept it close throughout.  Following a botched two-point conversion by the Wolverines after they had taken a 20–10 lead, the Hawkeyes went to work.  Following one Hawkeye touchdown countered by a Michigan field goal, the Hawkeyes put together a drive for the ages, never facing a third-down.  Tony Stewart grabbed the last of a series of key passes from Matt Rodgers with one hand, giving the Hawkeyes the ball at the Michigan 1-yard line.  Paul Kujawa ran it in from there, and with the extra point, the Hawks took the lead by the eventual final score of 24–23.  A sack by Moses Santos and an interception by linebacker John Derby sealed the stunner. It was Michigan's first loss on Homecoming since the 1967 season.

Northwestern

Sources: Box Score and Game Story

Nick Bell rushed 16 times for 136 yards and 3 touchdowns. Tony Stewart added 122 yards on 15 carries as the Hawkeyes rushed for 371 yards.

at Illinois

Sources: [ Box score]

The Hawks key road triumphs weren't finished as they traveled to Champaign, Illinois. Against an Illinois team that had the inside track to the Rose Bowl, Iowa put together one of their best offensive games in the Fry era, especially for a key road game.  The Hawkeyes used an early fumble by the Illini to begin an exhibition by RB Nick Bell, the likes of which had rarely been seen in the Big 10 between two undefeated teams (in conference play).  Bell literally ran over the Illini, scampering for 130 yards in the 1st quarter alone. The Hawks led by an amazing 28–0 early in the second quarter, and they stretched it to 44–14 by the end of the 3rd quarter, before settling for a 54–28 final.  It was most likely from the efforts of that game that Nick Bell was named by the media as the Big 10 player of the year.

Ohio State

Sources: Box Score and Game Story

The Hawkeye bubble burst in Iowa City with a last-second loss to Ohio State. Buckeye WR Bobby Olive caught the game winning TD, his second scoring reception of the 4th quarter, from QB Greg Frey with 0:01 left on the clock. Ohio State also scored a 48-yard touchdown as the first half expired.

Purdue

Sources: Box Score and Game Story

The Hawkeyes, entering as 26-point favorites, bounced back with what proved to be a Big 10-clinching win at home against Purdue.

at Minnesota

Sources: Box Score and Game Story

Knowing that they were Rose Bowl-bound before they even took the field, the Hawkeyes dropped their final road game at Minnesota, 31–24. In that game, Tony Stewart became the Hawkeyes all-time leading rusher (at least at that time), though he lost a key fumble on that play.

Rose Bowl

Sources: [Box score]

The Rose Bowl placed an over-matched Iowa against one of the best teams in the country that season, the Washington Huskies, led by head coach Don James. The Hawkeyes trailed badly at the half and trailed 39–14 after three quarters. With Washington reserves taking over in the fourth quarter, Iowa scored two touchdowns to draw within thirteen. With another Washington touchdown the margin was back to twenty, and Iowa's late last score and conversion brought them to within a dozen where the game ended, 46–34. It was Hayden Fry's last trip to Pasadena, and he ended up 0–3 in those games.

Postseason awards
Hayden Fry – Big Ten Coach of the Year
Nick Bell and Matt Rodgers – co-Big Ten Offensive Player of the Year (coaches)
Merton Hanks – All-American Defensive Back (Newspaper Enterprise Association)

Team players in the 1991 NFL draft

Other notable players
 Bret Bielema, nose guard – Head coach at Wisconsin, 2006–2012, Head coach at Arkansas, 2013–2017.

References

Iowa
Iowa Hawkeyes football seasons
Big Ten Conference football champion seasons
Iowa Hawkeyes football